In Rainbows is the seventh studio album by the English rock band Radiohead. It was self-released on 10 October 2007 as a pay-what-you-want download, followed by a physical release internationally through XL Recordings and in North America through TBD Records. It was Radiohead's first release after their recording contract with EMI ended with their album Hail to the Thief (2003).

Radiohead began work on In Rainbows in early 2005. In 2006, after initial recording sessions with their new producer Spike Stent proved fruitless, they re-enlisted their longtime producer Nigel Godrich. Radiohead recorded in the country houses Halswell House and Tottenham House, the Hospital Club in London, and their studio in Oxfordshire. They incorporated conventional rock instrumentation plus electronic instruments, strings, piano and the ondes Martenot. The lyrics are less political and more personal than previous Radiohead albums.

Radiohead self-released In Rainbows online and allowed fans to set their own price, saying this liberated them from conventional promotional formats and removed barriers to audiences. It was the first such release by a major act and drew international media attention. Many praised Radiohead for challenging old models and finding new ways to connect with fans, while others felt it set a dangerous precedent at the expense of less successful artists.

Radiohead promoted In Rainbows with webcasts, music videos, competitions and a worldwide tour. "Jigsaw Falling into Place" and "Nude" were released as singles; "Nude" became Radiohead's first US top-40 song since their debut single "Creep" (1992). The retail release of In Rainbows topped the UK Albums Chart and the US Billboard 200, and by October 2008 it had sold over three million copies worldwide. It is certified platinum in the UK and Canada and gold in the US, Belgium and Japan. In Rainbows received acclaim, winning Grammy Awards for Best Alternative Music Album and Best Boxed or Special Limited Edition Package, and was ranked one of the best albums of the year and the decade by various publications. Rolling Stone included In Rainbows in its updated lists of the 500 Greatest Albums of All Time.

Background
In 2004, after finishing the world tour for their sixth studio album Hail to the Thief (2003), Radiohead went on hiatus. As Hail to the Thief was the final album released under their record contract with EMI, they had no contractual obligation to release new material. According to the New York Times, Radiohead were in 2006 "by far the world's most popular unsigned band". The drummer, Philip Selway, said Radiohead still wanted to create music, but took a break to focus on other areas of their lives, and that the end of their contract provided a natural point to pause and reflect. 

In 2005, the singer and songwriter, Thom Yorke, appeared on the web series From the Basement, performing the future In Rainbows tracks "Videotape", "Down is the New Up" and "Last Flowers". He released his first solo album, The Eraser, in 2006. The lead guitarist, Jonny Greenwood, also released his first solo works, the soundtracks Bodysong (2004) and There Will Be Blood (2007).

Recording 
In March 2005, Radiohead began writing and recording in their Oxfordshire studio. They initially chose to work without their longtime producer Nigel Godrich. According to the guitarist Ed O'Brien, "We were a little bit in the comfort zone ... We've been working together for 10 years, and we all love one another too much." The bassist, Colin Greenwood, later denied this, saying Godrich had been busy working with Charlotte Gainsbourg and Beck. At the Ether Festival in July 2005, Jonny Greenwood and Yorke performed a version of the future In Rainbows track "Weird Fishes/Arpeggi" with the London Sinfonietta orchestra and the Arab Orchestra of Nazareth.

Regular recording sessions began in August 2005, with Radiohead updating fans on their progress intermittently on their new blog, Dead Air Space. The sessions were slow, and the band struggled to regain confidence. According to Yorke, "We spent a long time in the studio just not going anywhere, wasting our time, and that was really, really frustrating." They attributed their slow progress to a lack of momentum after their break, the lack of deadline and producer and the fact that all the members had become fathers. O'Brien said Radiohead considered splitting up, but kept working "because when you got beyond all the shit and the bollocks, the core of these songs were really good".

In December 2005, Radiohead hired the producer Spike Stent, who had worked with artists including U2 and Björk, to help them work through their material. O'Brien told Mojo: "Spike listened to the stuff we'd been self-producing. These weren't demos, they'd been recorded in proper studios, and he said, 'The sounds aren't good enough.'" However, the collaboration with Stent was unsuccessful.

In an effort to break the deadlock, Radiohead decided to tour for the first time since 2004. They performed in Europe and North America in May and June 2006, and returned to Europe for several festivals in August, performing many new songs. According to Yorke, the tour forced them to finish writing the songs. He said: "Rather than it being a nightmare, it was really, really good fun, because suddenly everyone is being spontaneous and no one's self-conscious because you're not in the studio ... It felt like being 16 again."

Nigel Godrich sessions 

After the tour, Radiohead scrapped their recordings and re-enlisted Godrich.<ref name=":5">{{Cite magazine |last=Vozick-Levinson |first=Simon |date=27 April 2012 |title=The making of Radiohead's In Rainbows''' |url=https://www.rollingstone.com/music/music-news/the-making-of-radioheads-in-rainbows-187534/|url-status=live|archive-url=https://web.archive.org/web/20190730031338/https://www.rollingstone.com/music/music-news/the-making-of-radioheads-in-rainbows-187534/|archive-date=30 July 2019|access-date=30 July 2019 |magazine=Rolling Stone}}</ref> According to Yorke, Godrich gave the band "a walloping kick up the arse". To focus them, Godrich transferred their rhythm tracks to a single track, where they could not be further altered. According to Colin, "The idea was to make us commit to something ... It was as if we were sampling ourselves. And when you mash sounds together like that they cross-pollinate, they marinade, they interact with each other... They have little sonic babies." Yorke said the band attempted to create "a sense of disembodiment" by using elements from different versions of songs; for example, "All I Need" was assembled from takes of four different versions.

For three weeks in October 2006, Radiohead worked at Tottenham House in Marlborough, Wiltshire, a country house scouted by Godrich. The band members lived in caravans, as the building was in a state of disrepair. Yorke described it as "derelict in the stricter sense of the word, where there's holes in the floor, rain coming through the ceilings, half the window panes missing ... There were places you just basically didn't go. It definitely had an effect. It had some pretty strange vibes." The sessions were productive, and the band recorded "Jigsaw Falling into Place" and "Bodysnatchers". Yorke wrote on Dead Air Space that Radiohead had "started the record properly now ... starting to get somewhere I think. Finally." During the recording, Colin Greenwood contracted temporary hearing loss and tinnitus brought upon by faulty headphones. 

That December, sessions took place at Halswell House in Taunton, and Godrich's Hospital studio in Covent Garden, London, where Radiohead recorded "Videotape" and "Nude". In January, Radiohead resumed recording in their Oxfordshire studio and started to post photos, lyrics, videos and samples of new songs on Dead Air Space. In June, having wrapped up recording, Godrich posted clips of songs on Dead Air Space.

Excluding "Last Flowers", which Yorke recorded in the Eraser sessions, the In Rainbows sessions produced 16 songs. Feeling Hail to the Thief was overlong, Radiohead wanted their next album to be concise. Yorke said: "I believe in the rock album as an artistic form of expression. In Rainbows is a conscious return to this form of 45-minute statement ... Our aim was to describe in 45 minutes, as coherently and conclusively as possible, what moves us." They settled on 10 songs, saving the rest for a bonus disc included in the limited edition. The album was mastered by Bob Ludwig in July 2007 at Gateway Mastering, New York City.

Songs
MusicIn Rainbows incorporates elements of art rock, experimental rock, art pop, and electronica. The opening track, "15 Step", features a handclap rhythm inspired by "Fuck the Pain Away" by Peaches. Radiohead recorded cheers by a group of children from the Matrix Music School & Arts Centre in Oxford.

"Bodysnatchers", which Yorke described as a combination of Wolfmother, Neu! and "dodgy hippy rock", was recorded when he was in a period of "hyperactive mania". On "All I Need", Jonny Greenwood wanted to capture the white noise generated by a band playing loudly in a room, which never occurs in the studio. His solution was to have a string section play every note of the scale, blanketing the frequencies.

Radiohead recorded a version of "Nude" during the OK Computer sessions, but discarded it; this version featured a Hammond organ, a "straighter" feel, and different lyrics. For In Rainbows, Colin Greenwood wrote a new bassline for the song, which Godrich said "transformed it from something very straight into something that had much more of a rhythmic flow". "Reckoner" developed while Radiohead were working on another song, "Feeling Pulled Apart by Horses". It features Yorke's falsetto, "frosty, clanging" percussion, a "meandering" guitar line, piano, and a string arrangement by Jonny Greenwood. Yorke described it as "a love song... sort of".

Yorke described the process of composing "Videotape" as "absolute agony", and said it "went through every possible parameter". He initially wanted it to be a "post-rave trance track", similar to the music of Surgeon, and Jonny Greenwood was "obsessed" with shifting the start of the bar. Radiohead performed a more conventional rock arrangement on tour in 2006, with Selway's drums building to a climax. For the album, Godrich and Greenwood stripped the song down to a minimal piano ballad, with percussion from a Roland TR-909 drum machine.

Lyrics
Yorke said that the In Rainbows lyrics were based on "that anonymous fear thing, sitting in traffic, thinking, 'I'm sure I'm supposed to be doing something else' ... it's similar to OK Computer in a way. It's much more terrifying." He said that, unlike Hail to the Thief, there was "very little anger" in In Rainbows: "It's in no way political, or, at least, doesn't feel that way to me. It very much explores the ideas of transience. It starts in one place and ends somewhere completely different." In another interview, Yorke said the album was "about the fucking panic of realising you're going to die! And that any time soon [I could] possibly [have] a heart attack when I next go for a run."

O'Brien described the lyrics as "universal. There wasn't a political agenda. It's being human." "Bodysnatchers" was inspired by Victorian ghost stories, the 1972 novel The Stepford Wives and Yorke's feeling of "your physical consciousness trapped without being able to connect fully with anything else". "Jigsaw Falling into Place" was inspired by the chaos witnessed by Yorke when he used to go out on the weekend in Oxford. He said: "The lyrics are quite caustic—the idea of 'before you're comatose' or whatever, drinking yourself into oblivion and getting fucked-up to forget ... [There] is partly this elation. But there's a much darker side."

Artwork
The In Rainbows artwork was designed by Radiohead's longtime collaborator Stanley Donwood. Donwood worked in the studio while Radiohead worked on the album, allowing the artwork to convey the mood of the music. He displayed images in the studio and on the studio computer for the band to interact with and comment on. He also posted images daily on the Radiohead website, though none were used in the final artwork.

Donwood experimented with photographic etching, putting prints into acid baths and throwing wax at paper, creating images influenced by NASA space photography. He originally planned to explore suburban life, but realised it did not fit the album, saying: "The music took a different direction and became much more organic, sensual and sexual, so I started working with wax and syringes." He described the final artwork as "very colourful ... It's a rainbow but it is very toxic, it's more like the sort of one you'd see in a puddle." Radiohead did not release the cover for the digital release, preferring to hold it back for the physical release. The limited edition includes a booklet containing additional artwork by Donwood.

Release
On 1 October 2007, Jonny Greenwood announced the album on Radiohead's blog, writing: "Well, the new album is finished, and it's coming out in 10 days; we've called it In Rainbows." The post contained a link to inrainbows.com, where users could pre-order an MP3 version of the album for any amount they wanted, including £0.

The release was landmark use of the pay-what-you-want model for music sales. It was suggested by Radiohead's managers, Bryce Edge and Chris Hufford, in April 2007. According to Selway, "Because [the album] was taking quite long, our management were twiddling thumbs at points and they were just coming up with ideas. And this was one that really stuck." Colin Greenwood explained the release as a way of avoiding the "regulated playlists" and "straitened formats" of radio and TV, ensuring listeners around the world would experience the music at the same time, and preventing leaks in advance of a physical release. He said that the decision had not been made for financial gain, and that if money had been Radiohead's motivation, they would have accepted an offer from Universal Records.

 Formats and distribution 
For the In Rainbows download, Radiohead employed the network provider PacketExchange to bypass public internet servers, using a less-trafficked private network. The download was packaged as a ZIP file containing the album's ten tracks encoded in a 160 kbit/s DRM-free MP3 format. The staggered online release began at about 5:30am GMT on 10 October 2007. On 10 December, the download was removed.

Fans could also order a limited "discbox" edition from Radiohead's website, containing the album on CD and two 12" heavyweight 45 rpm vinyl records with artwork and lyric booklets, plus an enhanced CD with eight additional tracks, digital photos and artwork, packaged in a hardcover book and slipcase. The limited edition was shipped from December 2007. In June 2009, Radiohead made the second In Rainbows disc available for download on their website for £6.

Radiohead ruled out an internet-only distribution, saying that 80% of people still bought physical releases and that it was important for them to have "an object". In Rainbows was released on CD and vinyl in Japan by BMG on 26 December 2007, in Australia on 29 December 2007 by Remote Control Records, and in the United States and Canada on 1 January 2008 by ATO imprint TBD Records and MapleMusic/Fontana respectively. Elsewhere, the album was released on 31 December 2007 by independent record label XL Recordings, which had released Yorke's solo album The Eraser. The CD release came in a cardboard package containing the CD, lyric booklet, and several stickers that could be placed on the blank jewel case to create cover art. In Rainbows was the first Radiohead album available for download in several digital music stores, such as the iTunes Store and Amazon MP3. On 10 June 2016, it was added to the free streaming service Spotify.

Radiohead retained ownership of the recordings and compositions for In Rainbows. The download and limited editions of the album were self-released; for the retail release, Radiohead licensed the music to record labels. Licensing agreements for all releases were managed by their publisher, Warner Chappell Music Publishing.

Reaction
The pay-what-you-want release, the first for a major musical act, attracted international media attention and sparked debate about the implications for the music industry. According to Mojo, the release was "hailed as a revolution in the way major bands sell their music", and the media's reaction was "almost overwhelmingly positive". Time called it "easily the most important release in the recent history of the music business" and Jon Pareles of The New York Times wrote that "for the beleaguered recording business Radiohead has put in motion the most audacious experiment in years". NME wrote that "the music world seemed to judder several rimes off its axis", and praised the fact that everyone, from fans to critics, had access to the album at the same time on release day: "the kind of moment of togetherness you don't get very often". The U2 singer Bono praised Radiohead as "courageous and imaginative in trying to figure out some new relationship with their audience". The rapper Jay-Z described the release as "genius", and the singer Courtney Love wrote on her blog: "The kamikaze pilot in me wants to do the same damn thing. I'm grateful for Radiohead for making the first move."

The release also drew criticism. Trent Reznor of Nine Inch Nails thought it did not go far enough, and accused Radiohead of using a compressed digital release as a bait-and-switch to promote a traditional record sale. Reznor released his sixth album, Ghosts I–IV, under a Creative Commons licence the following year. The singer Lily Allen said the release was "arrogant" and sent a bad message to less successful acts, saying: "You don't choose how to pay for eggs. Why should it be different for music?" The Sonic Youth bassist Kim Gordon said the release "seemed really community-oriented, but it wasn't catered towards their musician brothers and sisters, who don't sell as many records [as Radiohead]. It makes everyone else look bad for not offering their music for whatever." The Guardian journalist Will Hodgkinson argued that Radiohead had made it impossible for less successful musicians to make a living from their music. The release surprised record executives; an unidentified executive at a major European label told Time: "This feels like yet another death knell. If the best band in the world doesn't want a part of us, I'm not sure what's left for this business."

The release came at a time when CD sales were falling due to internet piracy. U2's manager Paul McGuinness said that 60 to 70 percent of Radiohead fans had pirated In Rainbows, and saw this as an indication that Radiohead's strategy had failed. However, the media measurement company BigChampagne concluded that the music industry should not think of piracy as lost sales, as Radiohead had shown that even releasing music free had not deterred it. Based on this report, Wired concluded that "by 'losing' the battle for the email addresses of those who downloaded their album via bit torrent, [Radiohead] actually won the overall war for the public's attention – no easy feat, these days". In a retrospective article, NME argued that Radiohead had demonstrated that the best response to piracy was to explore alternative ways to connect with fans, offering content at different price points: "The pay-what-you-want aspect isn't something to be followed slavishly ... It's the willingness to try it and the connection with fans that made it successful that should be an inspiration."

Responding to criticisms, Jonny Greenwood said Radiohead were responding to the culture of downloading free music, which he likened to the legend of King Canute: "You can't pretend the flood isn't happening." Colin said the criticism was "worrying about all these ancillary questions and forgetting about the primal urge of people to share and enjoy music. And there's always going to be a way of finding money or livings to be made out of it." Yorke told the BBC: "We have a moral justification in what we did in the sense that the majors and the big infrastructure of the music business has not addressed the way artists communicate directly with their fans ... Not only do they get in the way, but they take all the cash."

Radiohead's managers defended the release as "a solution for Radiohead, not the industry", and doubted "it would work the same way [for Radiohead] ever again". Radiohead have not used the pay-what-you-want system for subsequent releases. In February 2013, Yorke told the Guardian that though Radiohead had hoped to subvert the corporate music industry with In Rainbows, he feared they had instead played into the hands of content providers such as Apple and Google: "They have to keep commodifying things to keep the share price up, but in doing so they have made all content, including music and newspapers, worthless, in order to make their billions. And this is what we want?" In the 2010s, Gigwise and DIY credited In Rainbows as the first "surprise album" — a major album released without prior marketing or publicity — ahead of acts such as Beyoncé and U2. 

 Dispute with EMI 

As Radiohead's recording contract with EMI ended in 2003, Radiohead recorded In Rainbows without a record label. Shortly before work began, Yorke told Time he said: "I like the people at our record company, but the time is at hand when you have to ask why anyone needs one. And, yes, it probably would give us some perverse pleasure to say 'fuck you' to this decaying business model."

In August 2007, as Radiohead were finishing In Rainbows, EMI was acquired by the private equity firm Terra Firma for US$6.4 billion (£4.7 billion), with Guy Hands as the new chief executive. EMI executives including Keith Wozencroft, who had signed Radiohead to EMI, travelled regularly to Radiohead's Oxfordshire studio in hopes of negotiating a new contract. The executives were "devastated" when Radiohead told them they would not be signing. O'Brien later said he had not realised Radiohead's importance to EMI: "That probably sounds really naive. But there weren't people going, 'You're so important.' We were just one of the bands on their roster." According to Eamonn Forde, author of The Final Days of EMI, Radiohead had lost faith in EMI and thought the new ownership would be a "bloodbath". O'Brien said Radiohead had believed a deal with EMI was possible, and that "it was really sad to leave all the people [we'd worked with] ... But Terra Firma don't understand the music industry." 

Hands believed that Radiohead would only have canceled their self-release plan with a "really big" offer, and an EMI spokesperson said that Radiohead had demanded "an extraordinary amount of money". Yorke and Radiohead's management released statements denying this, and said that they had instead wanted control over their back catalogue, which Hands had refused. Edge said "we sold 25 million records and we have the moral rights over those six albums". According to Hands, Radiohead wanted a large payment in addition to ownership of their back catalogue, which EMI "valued even more". He estimated that they had wanted "millions and millions". Responding to Hands's statement, Yorke told an interviewer: "It fucking pissed me off. We could have taken them to court. The idea that we were after so much money was stretching the truth to breaking point. That was his PR company briefing against us and I'll tell you what, it fucking ruined my Christmas."

Days after Radiohead signed to XL, EMI announced a box set of Radiohead albums recorded before In Rainbows, released in the same week as the In Rainbows special edition. Radiohead were reportedly "incensed" at the release; commentators including the Guardian saw it as retaliation for the band choosing not to sign with EMI. Hands defended the reissues as necessary to boost EMI's revenues and said that "we don't have a huge amount of reasons to be nice [to Radiohead]". The box set was promoted on Google Ads with an advert falsely claiming that In Rainbows was included. EMI removed it, citing a "data source glitch". A spokesperson for Radiohead said they accepted this was a genuine mistake.

Promotion

 Webcasts 
Following the release of In Rainbows, Radiohead broadcast two webcasts from their Oxfordshire studio: "Thumbs Down" in November 2007 and "Scotch Mist" on New Year's Eve. In the US, "Scotch Mist" was also broadcast on the liberal media outlet Current TV. The webcasts featured performances of In Rainbows songs, covers of songs by New Order, the Smiths and Björk, poetry, and videos created with the comedian Adam Buxton and the filmmaker Garth Jennings. Colin Greenwood described the webcasts as spontaneous and liberating, bypassing the usual lengthy process of commissioning music videos.

 Singles and music videos 
The first single from In Rainbows, "Jigsaw Falling into Place", was released in January 2008, followed by "Nude" on 31 March. They were accompanied by music videos directed by Buxton and Jennings. Radiohead held remix competitions for "Nude" and "Reckoner", releasing the separated stems for purchase, and streamed the entries on their website. "Nude" debuted at number 37 on the Billboard Hot 100; boosted by sales of the stems, it was the first Radiohead song to enter the chart since "High and Dry" (1995) and Radiohead's first US top-40 song since their debut single "Creep" (1992). In July, Radiohead released a video for "House of Cards", made with lidar technology instead of cameras.

In March 2008, Radiohead ran a contest with the animation company Aniboom whereby entrants submitted concepts for animated music videos for In Rainbows songs. Semifinalists were chosen by TBD Records and the Cartoon Network programming block Adult Swim. Unable to choose only one winner, Radiohead awarded the full prize money of $10,000 each to four semifinalists, who created videos for "15 Step", "Weird Fishes", "Reckoner" and "Videotape".

 Live performances 
On 16 January 2008, a surprise Radiohead performance at the London record shop Rough Trade East was relocated to a nearby club after police raised safety concerns. Radiohead toured North America, Europe, South America and Japan from May 2008 until March 2009. To determine how they could reduce carbon emissions for the tour, Radiohead commissioned the environmental group Best Foot Forward. Based on the findings, Radiohead played in amphitheatres in city centres to reduce reliance on flights for attendees, and used a carbon-neutral "forest" of LEDs on stage. 

Radiohead recorded a live video, In Rainbows — From the Basement, broadcast on VH1 in May 2008. In February 2009, Yorke and Jonny Greenwood performed "15 Step" with the University of Southern California Marching Band at the televised 51st Annual Grammy Awards.

Sales

 Digital 
In early October 2007, a Radiohead spokesperson reported that most downloaders paid "a normal retail price" for the digital version of In Rainbows, and that most fans had pre-ordered the limited edition. Citing a source close to the band, Gigwise reported that In Rainbows had sold 1.2 million digital copies before its retail release; this was dismissed by Radiohead's co-manager Bryce Edge as "exaggerated".

According to research released in November 2007 by the market research firm Comscore, downloaders paid an average of $2.26 per download globally, and 62% of downloaders paid nothing. Of those who paid, the average paid was $6 globally, with 12% paying between $8 and $12, around the typical cost of an album on iTunes. Radiohead dismissed the report as "wholly inaccurate", but said that the results had been good. Another survey, conducted by the industry organisation Record of the Day, found that 28.5% of those who downloaded the album paid nothing or £0.01 and the average price per download was £3.88. In December 2007, Yorke said that Radiohead had made more money from digital sales of In Rainbows than the digital sales of all previous Radiohead albums combined.

In October 2008, one year after the release, Warner Chappell reported that although most people paid nothing for the download, prerelease sales for In Rainbows had been more profitable than the total sales of Hail to the Thief and that the limited edition had sold 100,000 copies. In 2009, Wired reported that Radiohead had made an "instantaneous" £3 million from the album. Pitchfork saw this as proof that, thanks to their fans, "Radiohead could release a record on the most secretive terms, basically for free, and still be wildly successful, even as industry profits continued to plummet."

According to the media measurement company BigChampagne, on the day of release, around 400,000 copies of In Rainbows were pirated via torrent. It had been shared 2.3 million times by 3 November 2007. At its peak, it was shared many times more than the second-most shared album released in the same period. Some piracy came from users driven to torrents after the official website overloaded.

 Retail 
Because inrainbows.com is not a chart-registered retailer, In Rainbows download and limited edition sales were not eligible for inclusion in the UK Albums Chart. On the week of its retail release, In Rainbows reached number one on the UK Albums Chart, with first-week sales of 44,602 copies. In the US, after some record stores broke street date agreements, it entered the Billboard 200 at number 156. However, in the first week of official release, it became the 10th independently distributed album to reach number one on the Billboard 200, selling 122,000 copies. In October 2008, Warner Chappell reported that In Rainbows had sold three million copies worldwide, including 1.75 million physical sales, since its retail release. It was the bestselling vinyl album of 2008.

Critical reception

On the review aggregate site Metacritic, In Rainbows earned a rating of 88 out of 100, based on 42 reviews, indicating "universal acclaim". Various reviewers, such as The Guardians Alexis Petridis, attributed the album's quality to Radiohead's performance in the studio and that the band sounded like they were enjoying themselves. Others, such as Billboards Jonathan Cohen, commended the album for not being overshadowed by its marketing hype. Andy Kellman of AllMusic wrote that In Rainbows "will hopefully be remembered as Radiohead's most stimulating synthesis of accessible songs and abstract sounds, rather than their first pick-your-price download".

The NME described the album as "Radiohead reconnecting with their human sides, realising you [can] embrace pop melodies and proper instruments while still sounding like paranoid androids ... This [is] otherworldly music, alright." Will Hermes, writing in Entertainment Weekly, called In Rainbows "the gentlest, prettiest Radiohead set yet" and stated that it "uses the full musical and emotional spectra to conjure breathtaking beauty". Rob Sheffield of Rolling Stone praised its "vividly collaborative sonic touches" and concluded: "No wasted moments, no weak tracks: just primo Radiohead." In 2011, The Rolling Stone Album Guide described it as Radiohead's "most expansive and seductive album, possibly their all-time high".

Jon Dolan of Blender called In Rainbows "far more pensive and reflective" than Hail to the Thief, writing that it "formulates a lush, sensualized ideal out of vague, layered discomfort". Spins Mikael Wood felt that the album "succeeds because all of that cold, clinical lab work hasn't eliminated the warmth from their music", while Pitchforks Mark Pytlik dubbed it a more "human" album that "represents the sound of Radiohead coming back to earth". Robert Christgau, writing for MSN Music, gave In Rainbows a two-star honourable mention and noted that the album, having been developed in concert, was "more jammy, less songy and less Yorkey, which is good". The Wire was more critical, finding "a sense here of a group magisterially marking time, shying away ... from any grand, rhetorical, countercultural purpose".

 Accolades In Rainbows was ranked among the best albums of 2007 by many music publications. It was ranked number one by Billboard, Mojo and PopMatters, third by NME and The A.V. Club, fourth by Pitchfork and Q, and sixth by Rolling Stone and Spin. It was also ranked one of the best albums of the decade by several publications: NME ranked it 10th, Paste 45th, Rolling Stone 30th, the Guardian 22nd, and Newsweek fifth. Rolling Stone ranked In Rainbows on its updated lists of the 500 Greatest Albums of All Time at number 336 in 2012 and 387 in 2020. It was included in the book 1001 Albums You Must Hear Before You Die. In 2019, the Guardian named it the 11th greatest album of the 21st century so far. In 2020, Rolling Stone named In Rainbows one of the 40 most groundbreaking albums for its pay-what-you want release, influencing acts such as Beyoncé and U2. In 2021, Pitchfork readers voted In Rainbows the fourth-greatest album of the previous 25 years.In Rainbows was nominated for the short list of the 2008 Mercury Prize, and won the Grammy awards for Best Alternative Music Album and Best Boxed or Special Limited Edition Package at the 51st Annual Grammy Awards. It was also nominated for Grammy awards for Album of the Year and Producer of the Year, Non-Classical (for Nigel Godrich), and "House of Cards" was nominated for Best Rock Performance by a Duo or Group with Vocal, Best Rock Song and Best Music Video.

Track listing

All songs written by Radiohead.

 "15 Step" – 3:58
 "Bodysnatchers" – 4:02
 "Nude" – 4:15
 "Weird Fishes/Arpeggi" – 5:18
 "All I Need" – 3:49
 "Faust Arp" – 2:10
 "Reckoner" – 4:50
 "House of Cards" – 5:28
 "Jigsaw Falling into Place" – 4:09
 "Videotape" – 4:40

In Rainbows Disk 2

The special edition of In Rainbows included a second disc, In Rainbows Disk 2, which contains eight additional tracks. In 2009, Radiohead made Disk 2 available to purchase as downloads on their website, and in October 2016 it was released on streaming and digital services.Pitchforks Chris Dahlen wrote that "a lesser band might have crammed some bootlegs and demo takes in here, but when Radiohead put something on disc, they want it to count". However, he criticised Yorke's vocals: "The cynical/alienated rut into which he grinds himself has the persistence of a toothache ... Yorke sounds like neither a post-millennial prophet nor an uncanny empathist, so much as a crank."

David Fricke of Rolling Stone wrote that "if you bought the deluxe box edition of In Rainbows just for the session leftovers, you did not get your eighty dollars' worth", but conceded that the songs "deserve to be on record". Stereogum wrote that the most impressive thing about Disk 2 was "how effortless it all seems".

Track listing

All songs written by Radiohead.

 "MK 1" – 1:03
 "Down Is the New Up" – 4:59
 "Go Slowly" – 3:48
 "MK 2" – 0:53
 "Last Flowers" – 4:26
 "Up on the Ladder" – 4:17
 "Bangers + Mash" – 3:19
 "4 Minute Warning" – 4:04

PersonnelRadiohead Colin Greenwood
 Jonny Greenwood
 Ed O'Brien
 Philip Selway
 Thom YorkeAdditional musicians The Millennia Ensemble – strings
 Everton Nelson – leading
 Sally Herbert – conducting
 Matrix Music School children's choir – uncredited choir on "15 Step"Production Nigel Godrich – production, mixing, engineering
 Richard Woodcraft – engineering
 Hugo Nicolson – engineering
 Dan Grech-Marguerat – engineering
 Graeme Stewart – preproduction
 Bob Ludwig – masteringArtwork'''
 Stanley Donwood
 Dr Tchock

Charts

Weekly charts

Year-end charts

Certifications and sales

References

External links

2007 albums
Albums free for download by copyright owner
Albums produced by Nigel Godrich
Grammy Award for Best Alternative Music Album
Radiohead albums
Self-released albums
XL Recordings albums
Art pop albums
Pop rock albums by English artists
Alternative rock albums by British artists
Art rock albums by British artists
Experimental rock albums by British artists
Surprise albums